Åke Pettersson (20 March 1926 – 21 November 2000) was a Finnish footballer. He played in three matches for the Finland national football team from 1947 to 1956. He was also part of Finland's squad for the 1952 Summer Olympics, but he did not play in any matches.

References

External links
 

1926 births
2000 deaths
Finnish footballers
Finland international footballers
Place of birth missing
Association football midfielders